Octagon is an unincorporated community in Marengo County, Alabama, United States.  Octagon had a post office at one time, but it no longer exists.

History
The community of Octagon obtained its name from the Bethlehem Baptist Church.  The first building for this church was an octagonal structure, built by George Washington Barkley and his sons after the American Civil War.  At one time the community also had a Methodist church, a two-story school, general store, cotton gin, and grist mill.  Only the Baptist church remains.

Geography

References

Unincorporated communities in Alabama
Unincorporated communities in Marengo County, Alabama